Ethmia submersa is a moth in the family Depressariidae. It was described by Alexey Diakonoff in 1966. It is found on Sulawesi.

The forewings are dark slaty grey, with well-defined whitish-grey narrow edges to the markings and large spots. The base of the extreme costal edge is black and there is a whitish streak along the base of the costa containing two black dots. Another such streak is subcostal and a less well-defined whitish patch fills out less than the posterior fifth of wing with the apex and termen. The hindwings are bright orange with a large apical black spot.

References

Moths described in 1966
submersa